A sea breeze is a wind from the sea.

Sea Breeze, seabreeze, or variants, may also refer to:

Places
 Seabreeze, a hamlet in Irondequoit, New York
 Sea Breeze, North Carolina, a census-designated place
 Sea Breeze, New Jersey, an unincorporated community in Fairfield Township, New Jersey
 Seabreeze, Florida, a former city, now a neighborhood in Daytona Beach, Florida
 Seabreeze, Texas, an unincorporated community
 Sea Breeze, a community in the township of Lake of Bays, Ontario, Canada

Structures
 Seabreeze Bridge, a bridge spanning the Halifax River in Daytona Beach, Florida
 Seabreeze High School, Daytona Beach, Florida, United States
 Sea Breeze Hospital, former name of NYC Health + Hospitals/Coney Island, in New York

Military
 Operation Sea Breeze, the name for the Gaza flotilla raid of the Israeli navy
 Operation Sea Breeze (Sri Lanka), a navy operation of the Sri Lankan Civil War
 Exercise Sea Breeze, an annual multinational Partnership for Peace (PFP) maritime exercise held in the Black Sea involving Standing NATO Maritime Group 2 and other PFP navies

Other uses
 Nightcliff Seabreeze Festival, formerly Seeabreeze Festival, in Darwin, Australia
 Sea breeze (cocktail), an alcoholic mixed drink
 Seabreeze Amusement Park, Irondequoit, New York
  (1958–2000), a cruise ship that sank in 2000
 Sea Breezes (magazine), a shipping magazine first issued in 1919
 Seabreeze (horse), a Thoroughbred racehorse
 Sea Breeze Stakes, original name of the Honeymoon Handicap Thoroughbred horse race
 "Sea Breezes" (song), a song by Roxy Music
 Blue or turquoise colours

See also
 Operation Sea Breeze (disambiguation)
 Hawaiian sea breeze (disambiguation)
 Ocean Breeze (disambiguation)
 Bay breeze (disambiguation)
 Sea (disambiguation)
 Breeze (disambiguation)